George John Browne, 3rd Marquess of Sligo (31 January 1820 – 30 August 1896) was an Irish peer.

The son of Howe Browne, 2nd Marquess of Sligo, George Browne was educated at Eton and Trinity College, Cambridge. He married three times but died without male issue. He married,

 firstly, Ellen Smythe, daughter of the 6th Viscount Strangford,
 secondly, Julia Nugent, daughter of the 9th Earl of Westmeath and
 thirdly, Isabelle de Peyronnet, daughter of the Vicomte de Peyronnet.

Like his predecessors, Browne prided himself on being an enlightened landlord. In the second year of the Great Irish Famine, Browne's tenants gathered at Westport House, the ancestral residence of the Marquesses of Sligo. Browne assured his tenants of his support for them, and proceeded to hand them guns (without regard for his own safety), enabling them to hunt for game. He also went into considerable debt in order to acquire cornmeal from the Americas, and converted most of Westport House into a soup kitchen for the starving peasants.

He is buried at Kensal Green Cemetery, London.

Sources

 G. E. C., ed. Geoffrey F. White. The Complete Peerage. (London: St. Chaterine Press, 1953) Vol. XII, Part 1, p. 25–26.

1820 births
People educated at Eton College
Alumni of Trinity College, Cambridge
1896 deaths
People from County Mayo
George
Burials at Kensal Green Cemetery
George
Irish landlords
19th-century Irish landowners